Chris Meloff (born May 7, 1952) is a Canadian former professional ice hockey player who played in the World Hockey Association (WHA). Drafted in the seventh round of the 1972 NHL Amateur Draft by the Minnesota North Stars, Meloff opted to play in the WHA after being selected by the Ottawa Nationals in the WHA General Player Draft. He played the 1972–73 WHA season with the Nationals.

References

External links

1952 births
Canadian ice hockey defencemen
Ice hockey people from Toronto
Jacksonville Barons players
Kitchener Rangers players
Living people
Minnesota North Stars draft picks
Mohawk Valley Comets (NAHL) players
Ottawa Nationals players
Peterborough Petes (ice hockey) players
Toronto Marlboros players